The 1925 presidential elections in Latvia took place on November 6, 1925 over a two parliamentary period. In the elections with three candidates, Jānis Čakste was re-elected as the President of Latvia.

Candidates

Election process and results 
The first ballot failed to elect the president because no candidate received more than 50 votes. Jānis Pliekšāns won 33 votes, Kārlis Ulmanis won 32, and Čakste won 29. Each candidate only received the total number of votes of members of the same party. In the second ballot, the LSDSP withdrew Pliekšāns' candidacy, which thus gave Čakste a comfortable majority of 60 votes.

References

Presidential elections in Latvia
Latvia
1925 in Latvia